Camille Henrot (born 1978) is a French artist who lives and works in Paris and New York.

Biography
Henrot was born in 1978 in Paris, France. She attended the École Nationale Supérieure des Arts Décoratifs where she studied film animation and soon after helped assist Pierre Huyghe who worked in advertising and making music videos. She is based in New York City. Henrot’s work includes film, sculpture, drawing, painting and installation.

Henrot has had solo exhibitions at the Baltimore Museum of Art (BMA), the Kunsthal Charlottenborg, the Musée des Beaux-Arts de Bordeaux, the Musée d'art contemporain de Montréal, the New Museum, and the New Orleans Museum of Art (NOMA).

Works

Grosse Fatigue 

Grosse Fatigue is a 13-minute color video that includes videos of screens, bodies, computer desktop, and computer windows. Henrot created Grosse Fatigue during her 2013 fellowship at the Smithsonian Institution in Washington D.C. The video makes use of themes such as insanity, madness, euphoria, and information overload. The work was presented during the Venice Biennale, upon the invitation of curator Massimiliano Gioni. With Grosse Fatigue, Henrot set herself the challenge of telling the story of the universe’s creation. The text that provides the audio component of the work was written in collaboration with Jacob Bromberg, performed by artist Akwetey Orraca-Tetteh, and accompanied with music was composed by Joakim.

The Pale Fox 
In 2014 the Chisenhale Gallery in London, in partnership with Kunsthal Charlottenborg, Copenhagen, Bétonsalon – Centre for art and research, Paris and Westfälischer Kunstverein, Münster, commissioned The Pale Fox, an exhibition comprising an architectural display system, found objects, drawing, bronze and ceramic sculpture and digital images. The project purports to articulate our desire to make sense of the world through the objects that surround us.  A catalogue of the show, entitled Elephant Child, was published in 2016 by Inventory Press and Koenig Books.

"Bad Dad & Beyond" series 
In 2015, Camille began a series of works that ponder the nature of authority figures.  This series involved watercolors, interactive sculptures, and a zoetrope.  For an exhibition at Metro Pictures, Henrot created a number of 3D printed telephones that connect to surrealist hotlines.

Saturday 
Saturday is a 20-minute 3-D film that immerses the viewer into the religious practices of the Seventh-day Adventists, using footage of baptisms in the United States, Tonga, and Tahiti as a metaphor for resurrection and spiritual change.  The work was part of the exhibit “Days Are Dogs” at the Palais de Tokyo in Paris in 2017.

Monday 
This exhibition was held at Fondazione Memmo a museum in Rome, and is inspired by the first day of the week, Monday. It is made up of various bronze sculptures that are somewhere in between the figurative and abstract which depict the feelings some may experience during this day of the week.

Egyptomania 
This slideshow shows pictures of objects related to Ancient Egyptian Art that were found on sale in 2009 on eBay. This slideshow attempts to answer the many unanswered questions about why this civilization is so influential through this compilation of images that create a mental fantasy Ancient Egypt. The associations between these objects was either symbolic or formal and included similarities in product or repetition of symbols such as pyramids and mummies which ties back to many perceptions people have with this culture.

Endangered Species 
Endangered Species is a set of sculptures made up of car engine hoses from cars with wild animal names such as Ford, Mustang and Opel Tigra. These car productions have stopped and relate back to the idea of what is destined to disappear and this idea of ecological threat shifting into the automobile industry, therefore inspiring Henrot to use some shapes from Bambara masks from Mali for her sculptures.

Sphinx 
This collection of drawings is made up of oil pastel on standard A4 paper which are exhibited on a metal board held up by magnets. They are an experiment of what happens to a form when it is repeated by hand to the point of exhaustion? Henrot repeats this drawing of a Sphinx onto dozens of sheets of paper until it almost becomes like a structured abstract pattern instead of a drawing. This brings up the question of where is the borderline between repeated decorative and narrative which might cause an object to have no meaning and simply becomes a decorative pattern.

Public Commissions 
In 2016 Henrot created the piece Ma Montagne (My Mountain) at Pailherols, Cantal, France.

Honors and awards
In 2010 Henrot was nominated for the Marcel Duchamp prize. She won the Silver Lion Award at the Venice Biennale in 2013 for Grosse Fatigue. In 2014, she was a finalist for the Hugo Boss Prize. In 2014, she was a finalist for the Absolut Art Award. The same year she won the Nam June Paik Award. In 2015 she was awarded the Edvard Munch prize . Henrot is promoted to the rank of Officer of the Ordre des Arts et des Lettres (Order of Arts and Letters) on March 23, 2017.

Art market
Henrot is represented by Hauser & Wirth and Galerie Kamel Mennour. She previously worked with Metro Pictures and Johann König (until 2022).

References

External links
Henrot in the collection of The Museum of Modern Art
images of Henrot's work on ArtNet

1978 births
Living people
20th-century French women artists
21st-century French women artists
École nationale supérieure des arts décoratifs alumni
Artists from Paris
French video artists
Feminist artists
French contemporary artists
Officiers of the Ordre des Arts et des Lettres